The designation Micromainframe (also rendered as MicroMainframe or Micro-mainframe) may refer to:
The Commodore PET SuperPET 9000 series microcomputer
The Intel iAPX 432 multiple-chip microprocessor

See also
Micro-mainframe link